Georgette Agutte (17 May 1867 – 5 September 1922) was a French painter.

Biography
She was born in Paris. Her father was Jean Georges Agutte. In 1893 she joined Gustave Moreau's classes as a free pupil, and retained his teachings on the freedom of mind and independence. She also met Matisse and Georges Rouault among others.

Agutte was a non-conformist and the only woman to attend the École nationale supérieure des Beaux-Arts. She was a member of the Fauvist movement and a sculptor. Her studio was in Bonnières-sur-Seine.

In 1888, she married the critic Paul Flat. After divorcing in 1894, she married socialist politician and art collector Marcel Sembat in 1897.

From 1904 on, she exhibited at the Salon des Indépendants and participated in the Salon d'Automne.

After her husband's death from a cerebral hemorrhage, she wrote on a note: "Voilà douze heures qu’il est parti. Je suis en retard" (He left 12 hours ago, I'm late) and committed suicide with a handgun, dying in Chamonix on 5 September 1922. Knowing the importance of their art collection, the conservator of the Musee de Grenoble, Andry-Farcy, made every effort to obtain it. The museum holds most of her works and presented a retrospective at the end of December 2003.

A street is named after her in the 18th arrondissement of Paris, and a boulevard jointly for her and Sembat in Grenoble.

Tapestry 
She supplied several models to the Aubusson National School of Decorative Art. A mountain landscape woven by her exhibited at the Salon des Artistes Décorateurs in 1921. At the International Exhibition of Decorative Arts that held in Paris in 1925, the Aubusson National School of Decorative Art presented  Georgette's fireplace screen with a bunch of marigolds and  Aubusson tapestry that woven in 1923, as well as mounted on a wood on its stand at the Grand Palais.

References

External links
 https://rkd.nl/en/explore/artists/709

1867 births
1922 suicides
Painters from Paris
French women painters
19th-century French painters
20th-century French painters
Painters who committed suicide
20th-century French women artists
19th-century French women artists
Suicides by firearm in France
1922 deaths